Kaisermühlen Blues is an Austrian television series.

See also
List of Austrian television series

External links
 

Austrian television series
ORF (broadcaster)
1992 Austrian television series debuts
1999 Austrian television series endings
1990s Austrian television series
German-language television shows